Dorothy Samuelson-Sandvid (14 November 1902 – August 1984), known as Dorfy, was a noted dialect author and journalist who specialised in the Geordie dialect.

Early life
Born Dorothy Pilbin in 1902 to a Quaker family in George Scott Street, South Shields, County Durham influenced by her childhood, she went on to write works concerned with the Geordie dialect. Educated at St. Johns' Higher Grade School, South Shields. As there was no work for her father the family moved from Shields to Irthington, then back to Shields before 1938, then to Allendale in 1946, and then Hexham in 1959.

Career
Dorfy had her own column for many years in the Shields Gazette revolving around her early twentieth century South Shields upbringing; spoken in the Geordie dialect.
In her later years she retired to Hexham.

Bibliography

 Basinful o' Geordie (1988)
 Between Ye an' Me (1969)
 I Remember (1976); A book detailing reminiscences from 1910 – 1914.
 Mair Geordie Taalks
 Watt cheor? (197?)
HOWAY HINNIES! Another Collection of Dialect Stories and Poems (195?)

References

1902 births
1984 deaths
People from South Shields
Writers from Hexham
English women non-fiction writers
English women journalists
20th-century English women writers
20th-century English writers